The Society of Texas Film Critics (STFC) was an organization composed of selected print, television, radio, and internet film critics from across the state of Texas. Every major metropolitan area of the state was represented among its membership.

The STFC was founded in 1994 by Michael MacCambridge, former film critic of the Austin American-Statesman. The organization presented a set of awards each year for excellence in film, including a Lone Star Award for a film set or shot in the Lone Star State. Founded with 21 members, the size of the organization decreased slightly each year.  By 1996, film critic Joe Leydon had taken the role of Society president. The group disbanded in 1998 after just four years of awards ceremonies.

Ceremonies

The past annual ceremonies for the Society of Texas Film Critics Awards were:
 Society of Texas Film Critics Awards 1994
 Society of Texas Film Critics Awards 1995
 Society of Texas Film Critics Awards 1996
 Society of Texas Film Critics Awards 1997

See also

References

 
American film critics associations
Cinema of Texas
Defunct organizations based in Texas
Organizations based in Houston
Organizations established in 1994
Organizations disestablished in 1998
1994 establishments in Texas
1998 disestablishments in Texas